Phalonidia subolivacea is a species of moth of the family Tortricidae. It is found on the Virgin Islands and Puerto Rico.

References

Moths described in 1897
Phalonidia